Montverde Academy is a private  PK–12 school in Montverde, Florida, United States.

History
The school was founded in 1912 as Montgomery Industrial School. The school president was Henry P. Carpenter. It underwent a major expansion in 1921, when two new buildings were built for a cost of almost $40,000, including a concrete block dormitory for 200 boys and a new dining hall. The expansion was funded by donations, including $11,000 from R. Jay Arnold of Groveland, Florida. This expansion brought the organization to a total of eight buildings on 200 acres and $150,000 worth of equipment. An observation tower above the new dormitory provided a view of Lake Apopka, Winter Garden, and Groveland. The dining facilities served 400 children. In the 1920s, sports teams were established. The teams were nicknamed The Crackers. In 1930, a girls' dormitory was constructed with funds raised by the D.A.R.

Demographics
There were 1,188 K-12 students enrolled in 2015–2016 as the information is not compiled for Pre-K students. The breakdown was:
Native American/Alaskan – 1.4%
Asian/Pacific islanders – 4.0%
Black – 7.7%
Hispanic – 9.3%
White – 44.8%
Multiracial – 32.8%

Athletic programs
Montverde's athletic programs compete on a national level, rather than as a member of the Florida State High School Athletic Association. Sports offered include baseball, basketball, cross country, equestrian, golf, lacrosse, powerlifting, soccer, softball, swimming, tennis, track and field, and volleyball.

In 2017 USA Today named Montverde Academy the best basketball program of the decade.

Controversy
In May 2017, Essence and  Fox 35 Orlando published a story about Montverde Academy harassing a 16-year-old African-American student who was told that her natural hair was against dress code policy. The school's headmaster, Kasey Kesselring, promised that the "dread lock" line would be removed from the hair policy in the student handbook. In May 2019, clickorlando.com and Horowitz Law published a story accusing Montverde Academy Dean of Students, Jerry Matos, of having an inappropriate sexual relationship with a female student. According to the United States Department of Agriculture, Headmaster Kasey Kesselring violated the Horse Protection Act, which resulted in a temporary disqualification from participating in equine events and a fine of $2,500.

Notable alumni

Precious Achiuwa (born 1999), Nigerian professional basketball player
Solomon Alabi (born 1988), Nigerian professional basketball player
Scottie Barnes (born 2001), American professional basketball player
RJ Barrett (born 2000), Canadian professional basketball player
James Bell (born 1992), American basketball player
Jordan Caroline (born 1996), American professional basketball player
Cade Cunningham (born 2001), American professional basketball player
Oumar Diakhite (born 1993), Senegalese professional soccer player
Joel Embiid (born 1994), Cameroonian professional basketball player
Michael Frazier II (born 1994), American professional basketball player
Patricio Garino (born 1993), Argentinian professional basketball player
Kasey Hill (born 1993), American professional basketball player
Dakari Johnson (born 1995), American professional basketball player
Balša Koprivica (born 2000), Serbian professional basketball player
Christ Koumadje (born 1996), Chadian professional basketball player
Francisco Lindor (born 1993), Puerto Rican professional baseball player 
Moses Moody (born 2002), American professional basketball player
Doral Moore (born 1997), American professional basketball player
Sandro Mamukelashvili (born 1999), Georgian professional basketball player
Luc Mbah a Moute (born 1986), Cameroonian professional basketball player
Andrew Nembhard (born 2000), Canadian professional basketball player
Landry Nnoko (born 1994), Cameroonian professional basketball player
Haukur Pálsson (born 1992), Icelandic professional basketball player
Ruslan Pateev (born 1990), Russian professional basketball player
Micah Potter (born 1998), American professional basketball player
Anthony Pérez (basketball) (born 1993), Venezuelan professional basketball player
Filip Petrušev (born 2000), Serbian professional basketball player
Sherrexcia Rolle (born 1988), Bahamian attorney and singer
D'Angelo Russell (born 1996), American professional basketball player
Matheus Silva (born 1996), Brazilian professional soccer player
 Simisola Shittu (born 1999), Canadian professional basketball player
Ben Simmons (born 1996), Australian professional basketball player
Rejjie Snow (born 1993), Irish hip hop artist
Devin Williams (born 1994), American professional basketball player
L. D. Williams (born 1988), American professional basketball player
Pavel Zakharov (born 2001), Russian professional basketball player

References

External links
 

Preparatory schools in Florida
Boarding schools in Florida
Private elementary schools in Florida
Private middle schools in Florida
High schools in Lake County, Florida
Private high schools in Florida
Educational institutions established in 1912
1912 establishments in Florida